The Treaty of Amity and Commerce between His Majesty the Magnificent King of Siam and the United States of America, or Roberts Treaty of 1833, was the first treaty between the United States and an Asian nation.

It established peaceful and friendly relations and commerce between the two states that have generally persisted since then. The treaty was signed on 20 March 1833 and, after ratification by both parties, it entered into force 14 April 1836. The treaty is no longer in force, having been replaced starting in 1921 by a series of subsequent treaties, but the successor treaty signed in 1966 remains in force. The 2017 edition of Treaties in Force, the official U.S. government report listing treaties and other international agreements to which the United States has become a party and which are carried on the records of the Department of State, includes the treaty signed in 1966 and does not include this 1833 treaty.

Negotiation, provisions, signing, ratification 
The treaty was  negotiated by Edmund Roberts in his capacity as Minister of the United States on behalf of President Andrew Jackson, with the Chau Phaya-Phraklang in his capacity as Minister of State on behalf of His Majesty the Sovereign and Magnificent King in the City of Sia-Yut'hia (later known as Rama III.)  

Roberts' first embassy arrived 18 February 1833 on the US Sloop-of-war Peacock, and was presented to Rama III on 18 March. 

Peacock returned on the second embassy, along with Dr. W. S. W. Ruschenberger, for exchange of ratifications 14 April 1836.

The treaty exists in two original language versions, in Thai and English, with translations in Portuguese and Chinese. Portuguese and Chinese were apparently relied upon as languages understood by both parties' negotiators, because, as the preamble states, "the Siamese are ignorant of English, and the Americans of Siamese."  

Its physical form is a scroll, about 90 inches (2.3 meters) long, with the four different language versions running next to one another for that entire length. 

The treaty's preamble provides for commercial intercourse between the parties "as long as Heaven and Earth shall endure". Article I establishes "perpetual peace" between the parties; Article II stipulates free trade with few limitations; Article III, a measurement duty in lieu of import and export duties, tonnage, licence to trade, or any other charge whatever; Article IV (and X,) for most favored nation status; and Article V, relief for US citizens in cases of shipwreck. Article VI introduces early US concepts of bankruptcy protection. Article VIII provides that US citizens taken by pirates and brought within the kingdom, be set at liberty and their property restored.

The treaty potentially granted the Americans much better terms than the British had obtained in their treaty of 1826. Though treaty provisions are not as generous as those of the British Bowring Treaty, the "most favored nation clauses" eased negotiation of the Harris modification to the treaty concluded about two decades later.

It was concluded on (as its preamble says) "Wednesday, the last of the fourth month of the year 1194, called Pi-marong-chat-tavasok, or the year of the Dragon, corresponding to "March 20, 1833, at the Royal City of Sia-Yut'hia, (commonly called Bangkok.), pending final Ratification of the President of the United States of America, by and with the advice and consent of the Senate. Ratification was advised and ratified 30 June 1834, exchanged 14 April 1836 (bringing the treaty into force), and proclaimed 24 June 1837. 

After the reign of King Rama V, the sensitive position of advisor on foreign affairs would be given to Americans and not to either English or French nationals.

Subsequent history 
The terms were modified by the Harris Treaty of 1856.

It was further modified by an agreement in the form of exchange of notes of December 17 and 31, 1867, entered into force January 1, 1868.

This 1833 treaty was replaced in 1921 by a Treaty  between the United States and the Kingdom of Siam, signed at Washington December 16, 1920 and entered into force September 1, 1921.  

That treaty signed in 1920 was replaced in 1938 by the Treaty of Friendship, Commerce and Navigation between the United States and Siam, signed at Bangkok November 13, 1937 and entered into force October 1, 1938.

That treaty signed in 1937 was replaced in 1968 by the Treaty of Amity and Economic Relations (Thailand–United States), signed at Bangkok May 29, 1966 and entered into force in 1968, which remains in force today.

See also 
 Edward Henry Strobel –  "American Adviser in Foreign Affairs" 
 Francis Bowes Sayre, Sr. − foreign affairs adviser
 Harris Treaty of 1856
 Treaty of Amity and Economic Relations (Thailand–United States) of 1966
 Thailand–United States relations

References

External links 
 Text of the Treaty of Amity and Commerce, signed in 1833.  From Library of Congress website, 11 Bevans 978 (i.e., Bevans, Charles I., compiled under direction of, Treaties and Other International Agreements of the United States of America 1776-1949, Department of State Publication 8728 (1974), v.11, p. 978).  
 Text of the Treaty signed in 1856, modifying the 1833 Treaty.  From Library of Congress website, 11 Bevans 982.
 Text of the agreement signed in 1867, further modifying the 1833 Treaty.  From Library of Congress website, 11 Bevans 992.
 Text of the Treaty signed in 1920, replacing the 1833 Treaty.  From Library of Congress website, 11 Bevans 997. 
 Text of the Treaty of Friendship, Commerce and Navigation, signed in 1937, replacing the 1920 Treaty.  From Library of Congress website, 11 Bevans 1016.
 Text of the Treaty of Friendship, Commerce and Navigation, signed in 1966, replacing the 1937 Treaty.  From UN website, 652 UNTS 253:
 English
 Thai
 French (unofficial translation)  
 

Thailand–United States relations
1836 treaties
Treaties of Thailand
1830s in Siam
Treaties of the United States
1836 in the United States
Foreign trade of Thailand